Euxoa lafontainei is a moth of the family Noctuidae. It is found in White Sands National Monument, Otero County, New Mexico.

The length of the forewings is 13–15 mm.

External links
The Lepidoptera of White Sands National Monument, Otero County, New Mexico, USA 1. Two new species of Noctuidae

Euxoa
Moths described in 2009
Moths of North America